The Cosmopolitan Music Society is a music education non-profit organization in Edmonton, Alberta, Canada.

History 
The Cosmopolitan Music Society was founded in 1963 by Canadian composer Harry Pinchin. At first the Cosmopolitan Music Society was named the Cosmopolitan Club Concert Band of Edmonton; however, by the mid-1970s the organization had shortened its name to the Cosmopolitan Music Society. Throughout the 1960s and 1970s, the organization held events at a range of venues in Edmonton, Alberta. In 1980, the Cosmopolitan Music Society began rehearsing and hosting events at its permanent location of 8426 Gateway Boulevard in Edmonton.

Mission 
The Cosmopolitan Music Society's mission is to "give amateur adult musicians and singers the opportunity to learn and perform quality jazz, big band, concert band and choral music." The society has several ensembles, and rehearses in the Old Strathcona Performing Arts Centre.

References

External links 
 Cosmopolitan Music Society

Cultural organizations based in Canada
Classical music in Canada
Organizations based in Edmonton
Organizations established in 1963
Arts organizations established in the 1960s
1963 establishments in Canada